Zhu Shengling (born November 1957) is a general of the Chinese People's Liberation Army. He has served as Political Commissar of the Central Theater Command since 2019. He previously served as Political Commissar of the People's Armed Police from 2017 to 2019.

Biography
Zhu Shengling was born November 1957 in Dongtai, Jiangsu Province. He has a master's degree in military sciences.

Zhu spent most of career in the former Nanjing Military Region, serving successively as Director of the Political Department of the 31st Group Army, Political Commissar of the Fujian Military District, Political Commissar of the Shanghai Garrison, and Director of the Political Department of the Nanjing Military Region from December 2014.

During Central Military Commission chairman Xi Jinping's military reform in January 2016, Zhu was appointed the inaugural Political Commissar of the newly established National Defense Mobilization Department of the Central Military Commission, serving alongside director Sheng Bin. In August 2016, both Zhu and Sheng were promoted to the rank of lieutenant general (zhong jiang).

In January 2017, Zhu was appointed Political Commissar of the People's Armed Police, succeeding the retiring general Sun Sijing.  

In January 2017, Zhu was appointed Political Commissar of the Central Theater Command, succeeding the retiring general Yin Fanlong.

In October 2017, he was elected a member of the 19th Central Committee of the Communist Party of China.

References

1957 births
Living people
People's Liberation Army generals from Jiangsu
Political commissars of the People's Armed Police
Members of the 19th Central Committee of the Chinese Communist Party
People from Dongtai